The Lancashire County Rugby Football Union is the society responsible for rugby union in the county of Lancashire, England, and is one of the constituent bodies of the national Rugby Football Union having been formed in 1881. In addition it is the county that has won the County Championship on most occasions

History

Early years 

The first match arranged for the county of Lancashire took place in 1870, at Leeds against Yorkshire. This match was immediately known as the "Battle of the Roses" and was considered the "blue riband" of Northern rugby football. To be selected to represent the county was an honour bestowed long before the foundation of the Lancashire RFU and it was seen as "the high road to International honours".

Formation of a Football Union 
From 1870 to 1881 the government and arrangement of county matches in Lancashire vested in Manchester Football Club. Though self-appointed, Manchester FC was recognised as the authority by the other great Lancashire club, Liverpool St. Helens. A movement of emerging new clubs, headed by W. Bell, the honorary secretary of the Broughton FC, had an objective to secure a voice in the selection of county teams. Bell was supported by an informal committee consisting of: G. C. Lindsay (Manchester Rangers), A. M. Crook (Free Wanderers), F. C. Hignett (Swinton), Hunter (Birch). 

Initial approaches to the Manchester Club were declined and in 1881 a general meeting of Lancashire clubs was called at which the following clubs were represented: Manchester Rangers; Free Wanderers; Broughton; Swinton; Walton; Rossendale; Oldham; Manchester Athletic; Rochdale Hornets; Chorley Birch; and Cheetham. Notably, the Manchester Club did not take part, but a resolution to form the Lancashire Football Union was agreed. The initial committee had W. Bell as its honorary secretary and G. C. Lindsay as the honorary treasurer. 

Two county matches were arranged altogether versus the Midland Counties and Lanarkshire (Scotland). Manchester then decided to wrest control of the county back and on 22 December 1881 met with the new Union and a duly constituted and representative governing body, its club to be called The Lancashire County Football Club, was formed. It was agreed the president, a vice-president, the hon. secretary and treasurer should be elected from the Manchester Football Club, a vice-president and a member of committee from the Liverpool Club, and the remaining eight names to be elected from clubs other than the Manchester and Liverpool clubs. Also, all Home County matches would be played on the ground of the Manchester Football Club. The first officers and clubs elected to represent the newly formed Lancashire County Football Club were:
PRESIDENT : James MacLaren, Esq. (Manchester).
VICE-PRESIDENTS : W. Brierley, Esq. (Manchester) ; E. Kewley, Esq. (Liverpool).
HON. SECRETARY AND TREASURER : W. Grave, Esq. (Manchester).
COMMITTEE : Manchester, Liverpool, Broughton, Cheetham, Preston, Manchester Rangers, Rochdale Hornets, Oldham, Swinton, and Free Wanderers.

The first match was versus the Midland Counties (the Lanarkshire match having been cancelled), played at Coventry on 26 March 1882. Albert Neilson Hornby became president after James MacLaren resigned the office on 1 October 1884. Lancashire was part of the Queen's Jubilee celebrations in 1887 when they were asked to play Middlesex at Kennington Oval on 12 March as a representation of Rugby Football, whilst Corinthians played Preston North End as an exposition of Association rules. Lancashire, led by Edward Temple Gurdon, won by a try, gained by Vincent Slater (Salford).

In February 1889 it was proposed that the county shall be divided out into five districts (Manchester, Liverpool, South-East Lancashire, West Lancashire, and North Lancashire) each with three representatives, removing club based representation on the committee.

1890–1900 
Lancashire won the 1890-91 season of the County Championship, despite the county championship having been organised by arch-rivals, Yorkshire. Lancashire won all their games with "not a goal being scored against them in any of the county matches they played". They then played "the Rest of England", on 18 April 1891. In 1891-92 Lancashire were defeated by Yorkshire who therefore wrested the championship of England from Lancashire. 

At this time, Lancashire County Football Club was made up of a number of clubs, and two sub-unions, West Lancashire Union (formed in 1884) and South-East Lancashire Union (predating the county Rugby Union having been formed in 1877):

 Aspull
 Askam
 Barrow-in- Furness
 Blackley Rangers
 Blackley
 Boothstown
 Broughton
 Broughton Rangers
 Bury
 Broughton Park
 Crompton
 Eccles RFC
 Failsworth
 Free Wanderers
 Leigh
 Liverpool
 Liverpool Old Boys
 Lancaster
 Manchester
 Manchester Rangers
 Morecambe
 Mossley
 Oldham
 Owens College
 Pendleton
 Radcliffe
 Rochdale Hornets
 Rochdale St. Clements
 Salford
 Stalybridge
 St. Helens
 St Helens Recs
 South-East Lancashire and Border Towns Rugby Union (Rugby Union)
 Southport
 Swinton
 Tottington
 Tuebrook
 Tyldesley
 Ulverston
 Walkden
 Warrington
 Werneth
 West Lancashire (Rugby Union)
 Widnes
 Wigan
 Waterloo

It was postulated that the comparatively small membership compared to Yorkshire had its roots in the fact that Yorkshire had a Challenge Cup, the eligibility for which was based on membership of the county union, whereas in Lancashire there was no equivalent.

Affiliated clubs 
There are currently 83 clubs affiliated with the Lancashire RFU, most of which have teams at both senior and junior level.  The majority of teams are based in Lancashire, parts of Greater Manchester and Merseyside, but there are also occasionally sides from Cheshire and even Cumbria that are members.

Aldwinians
Anti-Assassins
Ashton-under-Lyne
Aspull 
Bay Horse 
Birchfield
Blackburn
Blackpool
Bolton
Broughton
Broughton Park
Burnage
Burnley
Bury
Carnforth
Chorley
Clitheroe
Colne & Nelson
Crosby St Marys
De la Salle
Didsbury Toc H
Eagle 
East City Saints
Eccles
Edge Hill University
England Fire Service
Firwood Waterloo
Fleetwood
Fylde
Garstang
Greater Manchester Fire Brigade
Greater Manchester Police
Heaton Moor
HM Prison Hindley
Lancashire Constabulary
Lancashire Ladies
Lancaster University
Leigh
Leyland Warriors
Littleborough
Liverpool Collegiate
Liverpool John Moores University
Liverpool Medical School
Lostock
Manchester
Manchester Medicals
Manchester Metropolitan University
Manchester YMCA
Mancunians
Merseyside Police
Mossley Hill
Myerscough College
Newton Le Willows
North Manchester
Old Bedians
Old Boltonians
Oldham
Ormskirk
Orrell
Orrell St James
Preston Grasshoppers
Rochdale
Rossendale
Ruskin Park
St Edwards Old Boys
Sedgley Park
Sefton
Southport
Tarleton
Thornton Cleveleys
Trafford MV
Tyldesley
University of Bolton
University of Central Lancashire
University of Cumbria 
University of Manchester
University of Salford
Vale of Lune
Warrington
West Park St Helens
Widnes 
Wigan
Wythenshawe

County club competitions 
The Lancashire RFU currently helps run the following competitions for club sides based in Lancashire:

Leagues
All leagues are by both the Lancashire RFU and Cheshire RFU and feature clubs based in Cheshire, Merseyside, Lancashire, Greater Manchester and the Isle of Man.

Lancs/Cheshire 1 - league ranked at tier 7 of the English rugby union system
South Lancs/Cheshire 1 - tier 7 league
South Lancs/Cheshire 2 - tier 8 league
Lancs/Cheshire Division 3 - tier 9 league

In 2018 several Lancashire Clubs lobbied the County to form a county based league system after repeated requests to change the RFU League structure in the North West had failed. The start of the 2018/19 season saw the founding of two Leagues in the ADM Lancashire County Leagues consisting of ten teams each. In the 2019/20 this was expanded to two 12 team leagues and by the 2020-21 season it had expanded to three senior 1st XV leagues consisting of three leagues and 35 clubs. In addition, two new "combination" leagues where formed consisting of two 10 team leagues.

ADM Premier Division 
ADM Championship Division
ADM 1st Division

Combination 1
Combination 2

Cups
 John Burgess Lancashire Trophy
 Brian Leigh Lancashire Trophy
 Lancashire Plate
 Alan Stone Lancashire Bowl

Discontinued competitions
North Lancashire/Cumbria - tier 7 league for Lancashire and Cumbria based clubs that was abolished in 2018
North Lancashire 2 - tier 9 league for Lancashire clubs that was abolished in 2015
Lancashire (North) - tier 8 league for Lancashire clubs that was abolished in 2017
North West 1 - tier 7 league for Lancashire, Cheshire and Cumbria clubs that was abolished in 2000
North West 2 - tier 8 league for Lancashire, Cheshire and Cumbria clubs that was abolished in 2000
North West 3 - tier 9 league for Lancashire, Cheshire and Cumbria clubs that was abolished in 2000
North-West East 3 - tier 12 league for Lancashire clubs that was abolished in 1992

County side

Honours 

The county side has reached the County Championship Final 38 times, winning the title on a record 25 occasions. Lancashire have played in twelve of the past fourteen finals (from 2003 to 2018) and has won nine of those twelve finals.

County Championship winners (25): 1891, 1935, 1938, 1947, 1948, 1949, 1955, 1969, 1973, 1977, 1980, 1982, 1988, 1990, 1992, 1993, 2003, 2006, 2009, 2010, 2011, 2013, 2014, 2017, 2018

Notable players 

Gerry Ainscough
Jack Anderton
Tom Banks
Bill Beaumont
Edmund Beswick
Steve Borthwick
Walter Bumby
William Burgess
Fran Cotton
Harry Eagles
Dick Greenwood
Edward Temple Gurdon
Albert Neilson Hornby
Barry Jackson, Captain of Lancashire and England International.
Thomas Kelly (also played for Devon Rugby Football Union)
Edward Kewley
Andi Kyriacou
Mike Leadbetter
Arthur Lees
Joe Mills
Tony Neary
Rob O'Donnell
William Openshaw
Malcolm Phillips
Hugh Rowley
Robert Seddon
Lancelot Slocock
Warren Spragg
Charles Thompson
James Valentine
Thomas Sherren Whittaker
Peter Williams
Sam Williams
Ryan De La Harpe
Sammy Southern
Martin Hynes
Duncan Sandford
James Holt Marsh

Presidents 

 1881/84 J McLaren ★ (Manchester)
 1884/14 A. N. Hornby (Manchester)
 1919/23 A M Crook ★ (Broughton Park)
 1923/24 H Williamson (Kersal)
 1924/26 A Brettagh (Liverpool)
 1926/28 T W S Pollok (Waterloo)
 1928/30 H S Johnson (Heaton Moor)
 1930/32 J E Kidd (Broughton Park)
 1932/34 J Milnes ★ (Manchester)
 1934/36 T J Bradburn (Manchester)
 1936/37 Dr E Moir (Manchester University)
 1937/39 T Brakell (Waterloo)
 1939/47 J Hunter (Manchester)
 1947/49 J Bradley (Warrington)
 1949/51 H G Preston (Waterloo)
 1951/53 J H Roberts (Prestwich)
 1953/55 J B G Whittaker (Manchester)
 1955/56 J R Locker ★ (Warrington)
 1956/57 E Ogden (Fylde)
 1957/58 S C Meikle (Waterloo)
 1958/59 H A Fry (Liverpool)
 1959/60 C B Sewell (Prestwich)
 1960/61 N Shaw (Eccles)
 1961/62 J Heaton (Waterloo)
 1962/63 R S Unsworth (Manchester)
 1963/64 V G Funduklian (Broughton Park)
 1964/65 R H Guest (Waterloo)
 1965/66 E Randell (Furness)
 1966/67 A Marsden (Preston Grasshoppers)
 1967/68 L Mortlock (Prestwich)
 1968/69 P G Clemence (Manchester)
 1969/70 W E Naylor (St. Helens)
 1970/71 A Shuker (Broughton Park)
 1971/72 R G Burton (Manchester)
 1972/73 C C C Burch (Warrington)
 1973/74 W R Hall (Heaton Moor)
 1974/75 R Higgins (Liverpool)
 1975/76 E Evans (Old Aldwinians)
 1976/77 G A Macintosh (Waterloo)
 1977/78 J H Waters (Kersal)
 1978/79 J Benson (Orrell)
 1979/80 J Walsh (Heaton Moor)
 1980/81 A Gott (Burnage)
 1981/82 J Burgess ★ (Broughton Park)
 1982/83 R H Wiseman (Preston Grasshoppers)
 1983/84 F Hardman (Sedgley Park)
 1984/85 Malcolm Phillips ★ (Fylde)
 1985/86 W G Bevan (Broughton Park)
 1986/87 Dr J E Ryner (Broughton Park)
 1987/88 I Sinclair (Heaton Moor)
 1988/89 W S B Faulds (Anti-Assassins/Bury)
 1989/90 K Jones (Manchester)
 1990/91 Dr N H Atkinson (Heaton Moor)
 1991/92 E Deasey (Rochdale)
 1992/93 B H England (Warrington)
 1993/94 R B Bretherton (Southport)
 1994/95 K Brown (Liverpool)
 1995/96 H E Neeley (Sedgley Park)
 1996/97 P E Hughes (Calder Vale)
 1997/98 W A Kershaw (Manchester)
 1998/99 B Leigh (Wigan)
 1999/00 R T J Briers (West Park)
 2000/01 T W Alexander (Tyldesley)
 2001/02 W G D Chappell (Bury)
 2002/03 E M Whiteside (Southport)
 2003/04 F Morgan (Wigan)
 2004/05 J W Dewhurst (Fleetwood)
 2005/06 M Cornelia (Warrington)
 2006/07 S M Parker (Manchester)
 2007/08 D N Herriman (Widnes)
 2008/09 K Andrews (West Park)
 2009/10 C Barker (Wigan)
 2010/11 D Welsh (Fleetwood)
 2011/12 T Hughes (Leigh)
 2012/13 M Worsley (West Park)
 2013/14 D Hodgson (Blackburn/Vale of Lune)
 2014/15 D Matthews (Liverpool St. Helens)
 2015/16 T Stirk (Fylde / Schools Union)
 2016/17 T Fitzgerald (Preston Grasshoppers)
 2017/18 S Blackburn (Rochdale)
 2018/19 D Clarke (Wigan)
 2019/20 G Burns - MBE (Waterloo)

Notes: ★ RFU President

Notes

See also
Northern Division
English rugby union system

References

External links 

Official website

Rugby union governing bodies in England
1881 establishments in England
Rugby union in Lancashire
Rugby union in Greater Manchester
Sport in Merseyside
Sports organizations established in 1881